John Andrew Park (born September 13, 1988) is a Korean-American singer.  He was a semi-finalist on the ninth season of American Idol; placing twentieth. He is the runner-up of Superstar K2, a Korean singing contest held by M.net.  He is currently signed to Music Farm Entertainment.

Biography

Early life
John Park was born in Chicago; prior to entering Superstar K2, he was a student at Northwestern University majoring in economics. He was a member of his college a cappella group Purple Haze.
He was a semi-finalist on the ninth season of American Idol.  He later auditioned for the Korean equivalent of "American Idol", Superstar k2, and finished second.

Education
Park attended Glenbrook North High School.  He is an Economics major at Northwestern University. He is currently taking a break from college to pursue a singing career in Korea.

Musical background
He is a fan of Stevie Wonder, John Legend, Gavin DeGraw, Marc Broussard and Jamie Cullum.

Personal life 
On April 8, 2022, it was confirmed that John will marry his non-celebrity girlfriend with an event on June 12, 2022.

American Idol 9
Park auditioned in Chicago for the ninth season of American Idol with "I Love You More Than You'll Ever Know" by Blood, Sweat and Tears. The judges were impressed in his audition especially Shania Twain and he made it to the Hollywood round.

He also performed "Sweet Escape" in the group round along with Haeley Vaughn, Jessica Furney and Kelsey Madsen who was cut that round. He made it to the semi-finals. During the top 24, he sang Billie Holiday's "God Bless the Child" and John Mayer's "Gravity" for the top 20, but he was eliminated.

Superstar K2
After American Idol, Park entered the second season of the Korean talent show Superstar K2, where he finished second.

Discography

Studio albums

Extended plays

Singles

As lead artist

As featured artist

Collaborations

Other charted songs

Music videos

Awards

Variety Show

References

External links
 

1988 births
Living people
American Idol participants
Superstar K participants
American musicians of Korean descent
Northwestern University alumni
American K-pop singers
Korean-language singers of the United States
American male pop singers
American male singer-songwriters
American contemporary R&B singers
Glenbrook North High School alumni
Music Farm artists
21st-century American male singers
21st-century American singers
South Korean baritones